This is the list of awards and nominations received by American actress, author, and producer Octavia Spencer. She received three nominations for the Academy Award for Best Supporting Actress, including one win for the film The Help. She also received three Screen Actors Guild Awards, three National Board of Review Awards, two Satellite Awards, two Critics' Choice Movie Awards, a Golden Globe Award, and a BAFTA Award.

Spencer is the first black actress to receive two consecutive Academy Award nominations in back-to-back years, the first black actress to receive two Academy Award nominations after a win, and the second-most nominated black actress to date.

Major awards

Academy Awards

British Academy of Film and Television Arts Awards

Golden Globe Awards

Primetime Emmy Awards

Producers Guild of America Awards

Screen Actors Guild Awards

Other awards and nominations

African American Film Critics

Alliance of Women Film Journalists

Australian Academy of Cinema and Television Arts Awards

Award Circuit Community Award

Black Film Critics Circle

Black Reel Awards

Black Reel TV Awards

Critics' Choice Awards

Independent Spirit Award

NAACP Image Awards

National Board of Review Awards

Satellite Awards

Saturn Awards

Critics awards

References

External links 
 List of awards and nominations at IMDb

Spencer, Octavia